Pierre Bornat is a French alpine skier and sport official best known for taking the Judge's Oath at the 1992 Winter Olympics in Albertville.

References
IOC 1992 Winter Olympics
Wendl, Karel. "The Olympic Oath - A Brief History" Citius, Altius, Fortius (Journal of Olympic History since 1997). Winter 1995. pp. 4,5.

French male alpine skiers
Year of birth missing (living people)
Living people
Olympic officials
Oath takers at the Olympic Games
20th-century French people